Tatuagem (Tattoo) is a 2013 Brazilian drama film, the feature film directorial debut of Hilton Lacerda. It was awarded as the Best Picture at the 2013 Festival de Gramado.

Plot 
The film is set in Recife in the 70's, and follows the story of Clécio Wanderley, the leader of the theatrical troupe Chão de Estrelas, which performs concerts full of debauchery and nudity. One of the main stars of the team is Paulete, with whom Clécio maintains a friendship. One day, Paulete receives a visit from his brother-in-law, the young Fininha, who is in the army. Enchanted by the universe created by the Chão de Estrelas, he is soon seduced by Clécio. It doesn't take long for them to engage in a romantic relationship, which puts him in a dubious situation: while increasing the bounds with the troupe members, he needs to deal with the existing repression of the army during the dictatorship.

Cast 
 Irandhir Santos as Wanderley 
 Jesuíta Barbosa as Araújo "Fininha" 
 Rodrigo Garcia as Paulete 
 Rafael Guedes as Depressílvio 
 Sílvio Restiffe as Professor Joubert 
 Sylvia Prado as Deusa 
 Ariclenes Barroso as Gusmão

Production 
Several stories and real people inspired the plot of Tatuagem. The leader of the theatrical group Chão de Estrelas is based on the Argentine playwright Túlio Carella, who lived in Recife during the 60s. The theater company itself represents the actual experience of  anarchic experiential troupe "Vivencial", which existed in the second half of the 70s.

After six weeks of preparation of cast, filming took place in the cities of Recife and Olinda in 2011.

References

External links
 

2013 LGBT-related films
2013 films
Brazilian drama films
Brazilian LGBT-related films
2013 directorial debut films
Films about Brazilian military dictatorship
Films shot in Olinda
Films shot in Recife
2013 drama films